Guy Hardy may refer to:

Guy U. Hardy, former United States Representative
Guy Hardy (Canadian politician), member of the National Assembly of Quebec